A Van de Graaff generator is an electrostatic generator which uses a moving belt to accumulate electric charge on a hollow metal globe on the top of an insulated column, creating very high electric potentials. It produces very high voltage direct current (DC) electricity at low current levels. It was invented by American physicist Robert J. Van de Graaff in 1929.
The potential difference achieved by modern Van de Graaff generators can be as much as 5 megavolts. A tabletop version can produce on the order of 100 kV and can store enough energy to produce visible electric sparks. Small Van de Graaff machines are produced for entertainment, and for physics education to teach electrostatics; larger ones are displayed in some science museums.

The Van de Graaff generator was originally developed as a particle accelerator for physics research, as its high potential can be used to accelerate subatomic particles to great speeds in an evacuated tube. It was the most powerful type of accelerator until the cyclotron was developed in the early 1930s. Van de Graaff generators are still used as accelerators to generate energetic particle and X-ray beams for nuclear research and nuclear medicine.

The voltage produced by an open-air Van de Graaff machine is limited by arcing and corona discharge to about 5 MV. Most modern industrial machines are enclosed in a pressurized tank of insulating gas; these can achieve potentials as large as about 25 MV.

History

Background 
The concept of an electrostatic generator in which charge is mechanically transported in small amounts into the interior of a high-voltage electrode originated with the Kelvin water dropper, invented in 1867 by William Thomson (Lord Kelvin), in which charged drops of water fall into a bucket with the same polarity charge, adding to the charge.
In a machine of this type, the gravitational force moves the drops against the opposing electrostatic field of the bucket. Kelvin himself first suggested using a belt to carry the charge instead of water. The first electrostatic machine that used an endless belt to transport charge was constructed in 1872 by Augusto Righi. It used an india rubber belt with wire rings along its length as charge carriers, which passed into a spherical metal electrode. The charge was applied to the belt from the grounded lower roller by electrostatic induction using a charged plate. John Gray also invented a belt machine about 1890. Another more complicated belt machine was invented in 1903 by Juan Burboa A more immediate inspiration for Van de Graaff was a generator W. F. G. Swann was developing in the 1920s in which charge was transported to an electrode by falling metal balls, thus returning to the principle of the Kelvin water dropper.

Initial development 

The Van de Graaff generator was developed, starting in 1929, by physicist Robert J. Van de Graaff at Princeton University, with help from colleague Nicholas Burke. The first model was demonstrated in October 1929. The first machine used an ordinary tin can, a small motor, and a silk ribbon bought at a five-and-dime store. After that, he went to the chairman of the physics department requesting $100 to make an improved version. He did get the money, with some difficulty. By 1931, he could report achieving 1.5 million volts, saying "The machine is simple, inexpensive, and portable. An ordinary lamp socket provides the only power needed." According to a patent application, it had two 60-cm-diameter charge-accumulation spheres mounted on borosilicate glass columns 180 cm high; the apparatus cost $90 in 1931.

Van de Graaff applied for a second patent in December 1931, which was assigned to Massachusetts Institute of Technology in exchange for a share of net income; the patent was later granted.

In 1933, Van de Graaff built a 40-ft (12-m) model at MIT's Round Hill facility, the use of which was donated by Colonel Edward H. R. Green. One consequence of the location of this generator in an aircraft hangar was the "pigeon effect": arcing from accumulated droppings on the outer surface of the spheres.

Higher energy machines 

In 1937, the Westinghouse Electric company built a  machine, the Westinghouse Atom Smasher capable of generating 5 MeV in Forest Hills, Pennsylvania. It marked the beginning of nuclear research for civilian applications. It was decommissioned in 1958 and was partially demolished in 2015. (The enclosure was laid on its side for safety reasons)

A more recent development is the tandem Van de Graaff accelerator, containing one or more Van de Graaff generators, in which negatively charged ions are accelerated through one potential difference before being stripped of two or more electrons, inside a high-voltage terminal, and accelerated again. An example of a three-stage operation has been built in Oxford Nuclear Laboratory in 1964 of a 10 MV single-ended "injector" and a 6 MV EN tandem.

By the 1970s, as much as 14 MV could be achieved at the terminal of a tandem that used a tank of high-pressure sulfur hexafluoride (SF6) gas to prevent sparking by trapping electrons. This allowed the generation of heavy ion beams of several tens of MeV, sufficient to study light-ion direct nuclear reactions. The greatest potential sustained by a Van de Graaff accelerator is 25.5 MV, achieved by the tandem in the Holifield Radioactive Ion Beam Facility in Oak Ridge National Laboratory.

A further development is the Pelletron, where the rubber or fabric belt is replaced by a chain of short conductive rods connected by insulating links, and the air-ionizing electrodes are replaced by a grounded roller and inductive charging electrode. The chain can be operated at a much greater velocity than a belt, and both the voltage and currents attainable are much greater than with a conventional Van de Graaff generator. The 14 UD Heavy Ion Accelerator at the Australian National University houses a 15 MV Pelletron.

The Nuclear Structure Facility (NSF) at Daresbury Laboratory was proposed in the 1970s, commissioned in 1981, and opened for experiments in 1983. It consisted of a tandem Van de Graaff generator operating routinely at 20 MV, housed in a distinctive building 70 m high. During its lifetime, it accelerated 80 different ion beams for experimental use, ranging from protons to uranium. A particular feature was the ability to accelerate rare isotopic and radioactive beams. Perhaps the most important discovery made using the NSF was that of super-deformed nuclei. These nuclei, when formed from the fusion of lighter elements, rotate very rapidly. The pattern of gamma rays emitted as they slow down provided detailed information about the inner structure of the nucleus. Following financial cutbacks, the NSF closed in 1993.

Description

A simple Van de Graaff generator consists of a belt of rubber (or a similar flexible dielectric material) moving over two rollers of differing material, one of which is surrounded by a hollow metal sphere. A comb-shaped metal electrode with sharp points (2 and 7 in the diagram), is positioned near each roller. The upper comb (2) is connected to the sphere, and the lower one (7) to ground.  When a motor is used to drive the belt, the triboelectric effect causes the transfer of electrons from the dissimilar materials of the belt and the two rollers. In the example shown, the rubber of the belt will become negatively charged while the acrylic glass of the upper roller will become positively charged.  The belt carries away negative charge on its inner surface while the upper roller accumulates positive charge.

Next, the strong electric field surrounding the positive upper roller (3) induces a very high electric field near the points of the nearby comb (2).  At the points of the comb, the field becomes strong enough to ionize air molecules. The electrons from the air molecules are attracted to the outside of the belt, while the positive ions go to the comb.  At the comb they are neutralized by electrons from the metal, thus leaving the comb and the attached outer shell (1) with fewer net electrons and a net positive charge. By Gauss's law (as illustrated in the Faraday ice pail experiment), the excess positive charge is accumulated on the outer surface of the outer shell, leaving no electric field inside the shell. Continuing to drive the belt causes further electrostatic induction, which can build up large amounts of charge on the shell. Charge will continue to accumulate until the rate of charge leaving the sphere (through leakage and corona discharge) equals the rate at which new charge is being carried into the sphere by the belt. 

Outside the terminal sphere, a high electric field results from the high voltage on the sphere, which would prevent the addition of further charge from the outside. However, since electrically charged conductors do not have any electric field inside, charges can be added continuously from the inside without needing to overcome the full potential of the outer shell. 

The larger the sphere and the farther it is from ground, the higher its peak potential. The sign of the charge (positive or negative) can be controlled by the selection of materials for the belt and rollers. Higher potentials on the sphere can also be achieved by using a voltage source to charge the belt directly, rather than relying solely on the triboelectric effect.

A Van de Graaff generator terminal does not need to be sphere-shaped to work, and in fact, the optimum shape is a sphere with an inward curve around the hole where the belt enters. A rounded terminal minimizes the electric field around it, allowing greater potentials to be achieved without ionization of the air, or other dielectric gas, surrounding it. Since a Van de Graaff generator can supply the same small current at almost any level of electrical potential, it is an example of a nearly ideal current source.

The maximal achievable potential is roughly equal to the sphere radius R multiplied by the electric field Emax at which corona discharges begin to form within the surrounding gas. This explains why Van de Graaff generators are often made with the largest possible diameter.

Use as a particle accelerator 

The initial motivation for the development of the Van de Graaff generator was as a source of high voltage to accelerate particles for nuclear physics experiments. The high potential difference between the surface of the terminal and ground results in a corresponding electric field.  When an ion source is placed near the surface of the sphere (typically within the sphere itself) the field will accelerate charged particles of the appropriate sign away from the sphere.  By insulating the generator with pressurized gas, the breakdown voltage can be raised, increasing the maximum energy of accelerated particles.

Tandem accelerators 

Particle-beam Van de Graaff accelerators are often used in a "tandem" configuration with the high potential terminal is located at the center of the machine. Negatively charged ions are injected at one end, where they are accelerated by attractive force toward the terminal. When the particles reach the terminal, they are stripped of some electrons to make them positively charged, and are subsequently accelerated by repulsive forces away from the terminal. This configuration results in two accelerations for the cost of one Van de Graaff generator and has the added advantage of leaving the complicated ion source instrumentation accessible near ground potential.

Pelletrons 

The pelletron is a style of tandem accelerator designed to overcome some of the disadvantages of using a belt to transfer charge to the high voltage terminal.  In the pelletron, the belt is replaced with "pellets," metal spheres joined by insulating links into a chain.  This chain of spheres serves the same function as the belt in a traditional Van de Graff accelerator - to convey charge to the high voltage terminal.  The separate charged spheres and higher durability of the chain mean that higher voltages can be achieved at the high voltage terminal, and charge can be conveyed to the terminal more quickly.

Entertainment and educational generators

The largest air-insulated Van de Graaff generator in the world, built by Dr. Van de Graaff in the 1930s, is now displayed permanently at Boston's Museum of Science. Shows using the Van de Graaff generator and several Tesla coils are conducted two to three times a day. Many science museums, such as the American Museum of Science and Energy, have small-scale Van de Graaff generators on display, and exploit their static-producing qualities to create "lightning" or make people's hair stand up. Van de Graaff generators are also used in schools and science shows.

Comparison with other electrostatic generators
Other electrostatic machines like the Wimshurst machine or Bonetti machine work similarly to the Van De Graaff; charge is transported by moving plates, disks, or cylinders to a high voltage electrode. For these generators, however, corona discharge from exposed metal parts at high potentials and poorer insulation result in smaller voltages. In an electrostatic generator, the rate of charge transported (current) to the high-voltage electrode is very small. After the machine is started, the voltage on the terminal electrode increases until the leakage current from the electrode equals the rate of charge transport. Therefore, leakage from the terminal determines the maximum voltage attainable. In the Van de Graaff generator, the belt allows the transport of charge into the interior of a large hollow spherical electrode. This is the ideal shape to minimize leakage and corona discharge, so the Van de Graaff generator can produce the greatest voltage. This is why the Van de Graaff design has been used for all electrostatic particle accelerators. In general, the larger the diameter and the smoother the sphere is, the higher the voltage that can be achieved.

Patents
  — "Electrostatic Generator"
  — "Apparatus For Reducing Electron Loading In Positive-Ion Accelerators"

See also
 
 
  – Metalworking process used to fabricate thin metal spheres

References

External links

 How Van de Graaff Generators Work with how to build, HowStuffWorks
 Interactive Java tutorial - Van de Graaff Generator National High Magnetic Field Laboratory
 Tandem Van de Graaff Accelerator Western Michigan University Physics
 Dr. Van de Graaff's huge machine at Museum of Science
 Van de Graaff Generator Frequently Asked Questions, Science Hobbyist
 Illustration from Report on Van de Graaff Generator From "Progress Report on the M.I.T. High-Voltage Generator at Round Hill" 
 Nikola Tesla, "". Scientific American, March, 1934. (.doc format)
 Paolo Brenni,The Van de Graaff Generator - An Electrostatic Machine for the 20th Century Bulletin of the Scientific Instrument Society No. 63 (1999)
 Charrier Jacques "Le générateur de Van de Graaff". Faculté des Sciences de Nantes.
 Hellborg, Ragnar, ed. Electrostatic Accelerators: Fundamentals and Applications [N.Y., N.Y.: Springer, 2005]. Available online at: https://books.google.com/books?id=tc6CEuIV1jEC&pg=PA51&lpg=PA51&dq=electrostatic+accelerator+book
 American Physical Society names ORNL's Holifield Facility historic physics site

Accelerator physics
American inventions
Electrostatic generators
1929 introductions